Berkeh is a village in Kushk-e Hezar Rural District, Beyza District, Sepidan County, Fars Province, Iran. At the 2006 census, its population was 220, in 48 families.

References 

Populated places in Beyza County